Chalcis (Ancient Greek & Katharevousa:), also called Chalkida or Halkida (Modern Greek:), is the chief town of the island of Euboea or Evia in Greece, situated on the Euripus Strait at its narrowest point. The name is preserved from antiquity and is derived from the Greek χαλκός (copper, bronze), though there is no trace of any mines in the area. In the Late Middle Ages, it was known as Negropont(e), an Italian name that has also been applied to the entire island of Euboea.

History

Ancient Greece

The earliest recorded mention of Chalcis is in the Iliad, where it is mentioned in the same line as its rival Eretria. It is also documented that the ships set for the Trojan War gathered at Aulis, the south bank of the strait near the city. Chamber tombs at Trypa and Vromousa dated to the Mycenaean period were excavated by Papavasiliou in 1910. In the 8th and 7th centuries BC, colonists from Chalcis founded thirty townships on the peninsula of Chalcidice and several important cities in Magna Graecia and Sicily, such as Naxos, Rhegion, Zankle and Cumae. Its mineral produces, metal-work, purple, and pottery not only found markets among these settlements but were distributed over the Mediterranean in the ships of Corinth and Samos.

With the help of these allies, Chalcis engaged the rival league of its neighbor Eretria in the so-called Lelantine War, by which it acquired the best agricultural district of Euboea and became the chief city of the island. Late in the 6th century BC, its prosperity was broken by a disastrous war with the Athenians, who expelled the ruling aristocracy and settled a cleruchy on the site. Chalcis subsequently became a member of both the Delian Leagues.

Chalkis has had a Greco-Jewish presence since antiquity, which is sometimes claimed to have been continuous and to thus form Europe's oldest Jewish community, although there is no evidence of it through the early Middle Ages.

In the Hellenistic period, it gained importance as a fortress by which the Macedonian rulers controlled central Greece. It was used by kings Antiochus III of Syria (192 BC) and Mithradates VI of Pontus (88 BC) as a base for invading Greece.

Under Roman rule, Chalcis retained a measure of commercial prosperity within the province of Achaea (the north half of Greece).

Middle Ages and early Modern period 

 

It is recorded as a city in the 6th-century Synecdemus and mentioned by the contemporary historian Procopius of Caesarea, who recorded that a movable bridge linked the two shores of the strait. In Byzantine times, Chalcis was usually called Euripos, a name also applied to the entire island of Euboea, although the ancient name survived in administrative and ecclesiastical usage until the 9th century; alternatively, it is possible that the name was given anew to a settlement that was founded in the 9th century in the location of the ancient city, after the latter had been abandoned in the early Middle Ages. The town survived an Arab naval raid in the 880s and its bishop is attested in the 869–70 Church council held at Constantinople.

By the 12th century, the town featured a Venetian trading station, being attacked by the Venetian fleet in 1171 and eventually seized by Venice in 1209, in the aftermath of the Fourth Crusade.

For Westerners, its common name was Negropont or Negroponte. This name comes indirectly from the Greek name of the Euripus Strait: the phrase στὸν Εὔριπον 'to Evripos', was rebracketed as στὸ Νεὔριπον 'to Nevripos', and became Negroponte in Italian by folk etymology, the ponte 'bridge' being interpreted as the bridge of Chalcis to Boeotia.

The town was a condominium between Venice and the Veronese barons of the rest of Euboea, known as the "triarchs", who resided there. Chalcis or Negroponte became a Latin Church diocese, see below. 
A large hoard of late medieval jewellery dating from Venetian times was found in Chalcis Castle in the nineteenth century and is now in the British Museum. The synagogue dated to around 1400.

Negroponte played a significant role in the history of Frankish Greece, and was attacked by the Principality of Achaea in the War of the Euboeote Succession (1257/8), the Catalan Company in 1317, the Turks in 1350/1, until it was finally captured by the Ottoman Empire after a long siege in 1470. That siege is the subject of the Rossini opera Maometto II. The Ottomans made it the seat of the Admiral of the Archipelago (the Aegean Islands). In 1688, it was successfully held by the Ottomans against a strong Venetian attack.

The modern town

Chalkida became part of the newborn Greek state after the Greek War of Independence. The modern town received an impetus in its export trade from the establishment of railway connection with Athens and its port Piraeus in 1904. In the early 20th century it was composed of two parts—the old walled town at the bridge over the Euripus, where a number of Turkish families continued to live until the late 19th century, and a sizeable Jewish community lived until World War II, and the more modern suburb that lies outside it, chiefly occupied by Greeks.

The old town, called the Castro (citadel), was surrounded by a full circuit of defense walls until they were completely razed for urban development around the start of the 20th century.

The city is served by a railway station and is the terminus for the Athens Suburban Railway to Athens.

Ecclesiastical history

Greek bishopric 

The Byzantine diocese of Chalkis was initially a suffragan of the Archdiocese of Corinth, but in the 9th century was transferred to the Metropolitan of Athens, remaining in the sway of the Patriarchate of Constantinople. It was also known as Euripo, like it's mentioned in the Byzantine imperial Notitia Episcopatuum since emperor Leo VI the Wise (886-912).

Several of its Greek bishops are recorded, but some disputed :
 Constantinus, signed in 458 a letter by the bishops of Greece to Byzantine emperor Leo I the Thracian after the murder by Coptic mobs of patriarch Proterius of Alexandria.
 Lequien list before him Anatolius (in 363), but he was probably bishop of Beroea in Syria Prima (now Aleppo). 
 next Lequien inserts, by benefit of doubt, Iohannes Damasceno, whom he also lists as bishop of Euroea (in Phoenicia) alias Evaria, in Phoenicia.
 Teodorus and Teofilattus, successive (?) bishops of Euripus, participated in the 869–70 Church council held at Constantinople. viz. the Council of Constantinople of 879–880, both treating the fate of Patriarch Photios I of Constantinople.

Latin crusader bishopric 
At the establishment of the crusader state Lordship of Negroponte, Chalcis or Negroponte (seat of the central one of its three 'triarchies' constituent baronies) became a Latin Church diocese, the first bishop being Theodorus, the Greek bishop of the see, who entered communion with the see of Rome, installed by papal legate.
 
On 8 February 1314, the Latin see was united in commendam (as an 'additional benefice') with the Latin Patriarchate of Constantinople, so that the exiled Patriarch, excluded from Constantinople itself since the Byzantine reconquest of the city, could have actual jurisdiction on Greek soil and exercise a direct role as head of the Latin clergy in what remained of Latin Greece.

Main sights 
The church of Saint Paraskevi (the patron saint of the island) was the church of the Dominican Priory of Negroponte, one of the first two houses authorized for the Order of Preachers' Province of Greece in 1249. Started about 1250, this is among the oldest examples of early Dominican architecture surviving, and is one of the only early Dominican churches to retain its original form until the present. The central arch over the iconostasis and the ceiling and walls of the south chapel are the best examples of Italian Gothic stone-carving in Greece. Images of the Dominican saints, Dominic and Peter Martyr, stand at the base of the central arch. The north chapel holds the tomb of the founder of the senatorial Lippamano family of Venice.  Some of the column capitals are Byzantine.

The bridges

The town is now connected to the mainland Greece by two bridges, the "Sliding Bridge" in the west at the narrowest point of the Euripus Strait and a suspension bridge.

The Euripus Strait which separates the city and the island from the mainland was bridged in 411 BC with a wooden bridge. In the time of Justinian the fixed bridge was replaced with a movable structure. The Turks replaced this once again with a fixed bridge. In 1856, a wooden swing bridge was built; in 1896, an iron swing bridge, and in 1962, the existing "sliding bridge"; the construction works of the 19th century destroyed the most part of the medieval castle built across the bridge. The Euripus Bridge or Chalcis Bridge, a cable-stayed suspension bridge opened in 1993, joins Chalcis to the mainland to the south.

A special tidal phenomenon takes place in the strait, as strong tidal currents reverse direction once every six hours, creating strong currents and maelstroms.

Municipality 
The municipality Chalcis was formed at the 2011 local government reform by the merger of Chalcis city itself with four former municipalities, which also became municipal units:
 Anthidona
 Avlida
 Lilantia
 Nea Artaki

The municipality has an area of 424.766 km2, the municipal unit 30.804 km2.

Transportation 

GR-44
GR-77

In 2003, a bypass of Chalcis was opened from the southern part of the bridge to connect with GR-77, also with access to GR-44.

Chalcis station is the northern terminus of the Oinoi–Chalcis railway, and is served by Line 3 of the Athens Suburban Railway.

Historical population

Notable residents

 Aristotle (384–322 BC, ancient philosopher, lived in Chalcis the last year of his life (323–322 BC))
 Giovanni Maria Angiolello from Vicenza, Italy, 15th century.
 Yiannis Anastasopoulos (1931–present), author
 Eva Asderaki Professional Tennis Umpire, first woman to umpire the US Open tennis final
 Sotiria Bellou (1921–1997), singer
 Angelos Basinas (1976–present), professional footballer
 Nikolaos Christodoulou, military officer
 Mordehai Frizis (1893–1940), military officer
 Dimitrios Katheniotis, military officer
 Nikolaos Kalogeropoulos, PM of Greece
 Konstantinos Kallias (1901–2004), politician
 Orestis Makris (1898–1975), actor and tenor
 Dimitris Mytaras (1934–2017), painter
 Georgios Papanikolaou (1883–1962), physician, Pap smear test founder
 Nikos Skalkottas (1901–1949), composer
 Giannis Skarimpas (Agia Efthymia, 1893–1984), author
 Georgios Papachatzis (1905–1991), jurist

Sports teams 
Chalcis also has a water polo team named NC Chalkida, a football (soccer) team named Chalkida F.C., as well as a junior football team named Evoikos Chalkida.

The Chalkida football team merged with Lilas Vasilikou for a period of two years (2004–2006). The team was finally dissolved because of financial difficulties. Although there was a team created with the same name (AOX) it does not represent the glorious team of the past.

Chalcis also has a basketball team (AGEX), which previously played in the Greek A2 Basketball League. For a while, Chalkida hosts the basketball team Ikaros Chalkidas that played in the top Greek Basket League.

Twin towns 

Chalcis is twinned with:

 Wuhan

Geography

Climate 

Chalcis has a mediterranean climate (Köppen climate classification: Csa), closely bordering a semi-arid climate with hot, dry summers and mild, rainy winters.

See also
 List of Catholic dioceses in Greece

References

Sources and external links

 
 
 GCatholic - (former and titular) Latin see
 Photos from Chalcis, Evoia
 Herodotus Project: B+W photo essay of ancient Chalcis
 Bibliography - ecclesiastical history
 Pius Bonifacius Gams, Series episcoporum Ecclesiae Catholicae, Leipzig 1931, pp. 430–431
 Michel Lequien, Oriens christianus in quatuor Patriarchatus digestus, Paris 1740, Vol. II, coll. 212-215
 Gaetano Moroni, Dizionario di erudizione storico-ecclesiastica, vol. 47, pp. 262–263
 Konrad Eubel, Hierarchia Catholica Medii Aevi, vol. 1, p. 367; vol. 2, p. 203; vol. 3, p. 259
 Raymond Janin, v. 2. 'Chalcis', in Dictionnaire d'Histoire et de Géographie ecclésiastiques, vol. XII, Paris 1953, coll. 278-279

 
Ancient Euboea
Cities in ancient Greece
Greek prefectural capitals
Mediterranean port cities and towns in Greece
Populated places in Euboea
Members of the Delian League
Ancient Greek cities
Populated places in ancient Euboea
Greek city-states